StAR is an album by Norwegian saxophonist Jan Garbarek, featuring Miroslav Vitouš and Peter Erskine, released on the ECM label in 1991.

Reception 
The Allmusic review by Rick Anderson awarded the album 4 stars and states "The tunes may be somewhat interchangeable, but the music is virtuosic, thoughtful and thoroughly lovely, at times heart-tugging. Makes you wish these three would get together more often"

Track listing
All compositions by Miroslav Vitouš except as indicated
 "Star" (Jan Garbarek) - 6:15 
 "Jumper" - 4:21 
 "Lamenting" - 6:08 
 "Anthem" (Peter Erskine) - 6:16 
 "Roses for You" - 5:39 
 "Clouds in the Mountain" - 4:38 
 "Snowman" (Erskine, Garbarek, Vitouš) - 5:21 
 "The Music of My People" (Erskine) - 3:42 
Recorded at Rainbow Studios in Oslo, Norway in January 1991

Personnel 
 Jan Garbarek - soprano saxophone, tenor saxophone
 Miroslav Vitouš - bass
 Peter Erskine - drums

References 

1991 albums
ECM Records albums
Jan Garbarek albums
Albums produced by Manfred Eicher